= Sankalpadariya =

- village
- Location within Madhya Pradesh Location within India
- Coordinates: 23.2392369°N 77.5726884°E
- Country: India
- State: Madhya Pradesh
- District: Bhopal
- Tehsil: Huzur
- Elevation: 458 m (1,503 ft)

Population (2011)
  - Total: 2,306
- Time zone: UTC+5:30 (IST)
- ISO 3166 code: MP-IN
- 2011 census code: 482437

Sankalpadariya is a village in the Bhopal district of Madhya Pradesh, India. It is located in the Huzur tehsil and the Phanda block.

== Demographics ==
According to the 2011 census of India, Sankalpadariya has 466 households. The effective literacy rate (i.e. the literacy rate of population excluding children aged 6 and below) is 72.51%.

Demographics (2011 Census)
| | Total | Male | Female |
|---|---|---|---|
| Population | 2306 | 1218 | 1088 |
| Children aged below 6 years | 342 | 177 | 165 |
| Scheduled caste | 679 | 357 | 322 |
| Scheduled tribe | 346 | 194 | 152 |
| Literates | 1424 | 865 | 559 |
| Workers (all) | 1283 | 739 | 544 |
| Main workers (total) | 444 | 358 | 86 |
| Main workers: Cultivators | 76 | 66 | 10 |
| Main workers: Agricultural labourers | 68 | 51 | 17 |
| Main workers: Household industry workers | 12 | 11 | 1 |
| Main workers: Other | 288 | 230 | 58 |
| Marginal workers (total) | 839 | 381 | 458 |
| Marginal workers: Cultivators | 13 | 7 | 6 |
| Marginal workers: Agricultural labourers | 473 | 178 | 295 |
| Marginal workers: Household industry workers | 12 | 5 | 7 |
| Marginal workers: Others | 341 | 191 | 150 |
| Non-workers | 1023 | 479 | 544 |
